"Any Colour You Like" is the eighth track on the English band Pink Floyd's 1973 album, The Dark Side of the Moon. It is an instrumental written by David Gilmour, Richard Wright and Nick Mason.

Composition
The piece itself has no lyrics and consists of a synthesised tune which segues into a guitar solo (some scat vocals are added later; these were more prominent in live versions but are still audible in the studio recording). It is approximately three minutes, 25 seconds in length. The piece used advanced effects for the time both in the keyboard and the guitar. Richard Wright used a VCS 3 synthesizer which was fed through a long tape loop to create the rising and falling keyboard solo. David Gilmour used two guitars with the Uni-Vibe guitar effect to create the harmonizing guitar solo for the rest of the work. "Any Colour You Like" is also known (and is even listed on the Dark Side guitar tablature book) as "Breathe (Second Reprise)" because the piece shares the same chord pattern (albeit somewhat funkier and uptempo) as the album's second song "Breathe" and its reprise at the end of "Time". It has also nearly the same chord sequence just transposed a whole step lower from E minor to D minor. In the original liner notes, songwriting credits contain a typo with Nick Mason's last name listed as Marson.

The origin of the title is unclear. Waters may have settled this question, in an interview with the musicologist and author Phil Rose, for Rose's collection of analytical essays, Which One's Pink?:

Live versions
On earlier Pink Floyd bootlegged versions of the piece, there was no keyboard solo, and the work was a long jam piece called "Scat Section" or "Scat". Gilmour frequently sang along with his guitar solo and the band's female backing singers sometimes came up on stage and sang as well.

In 1975, it was often extended, sometimes up to nearly fifteen minutes. Gilmour and the backing singers often sang along with it.

In 1994, it was considerably modified, to be more keyboard-heavy, though not extended, as in all earlier performances. This version is included on Pulse.

Waters performed it in his 2006–08 The Dark Side of the Moon Live tour.

Personnel
David Gilmour – electric guitars, scat singing
Richard Wright – Hammond organ, EMS VCS 3, EMS Synthi AKS
Roger Waters – bass guitar
Nick Mason – drums, percussion

References
Footnotes

Citations

1973 songs
Pink Floyd songs
Rock instrumentals
Songs written by Nick Mason
Songs written by David Gilmour
Songs written by Richard Wright (musician)
Song recordings produced by David Gilmour
Song recordings produced by Roger Waters
Song recordings produced by Richard Wright (musician)
Song recordings produced by Nick Mason
1970s instrumentals